is a core city located in Nagasaki Prefecture, Japan. It is also the second largest city in Nagasaki Prefecture, after its capital, Nagasaki. On 1 June 2019, the city had an estimated population of 247,739 and a population density of 581 persons per km2 (1,505 persons per square mile).

The city includes a part of Saikai National Park. Located in the southern part of the city is the Dutch-styled theme park Huis Ten Bosch. The island of Ukujima is also administered as part of Sasebo city.

History
The area of present-day Sasebo was a small fishing village under the control of nearby Hirado Domain until shortly after the start of the Meiji period. Imperial Japanese Navy Admiral Tōgō Heihachirō, when surveying the coasts of northwestern Kyūshū for the site of a navy base, selected his location based on its protected, deep-water harbor, geographic proximity to China and Korea, and the presence of nearby coal fields. Sasebo Naval District, founded in 1886, became the major port for the Japanese navy in its operations in the First Sino-Japanese War and Russo-Japanese War, and remained a major naval base to the end of World War II. Along with the base facilities, the navy also constructed the Sasebo Naval Arsenal, which included major shipyards and repair facilities.

Sasebo City was founded on April 1, 1902. The city which had 206,000 inhabitants in 1945 suffered severe damage by bombing on June 29, 1945, during World War II. 48% of the city was destroyed. Sasebo was one of the original 17 targets selected for the dropping of the atomic bomb.

After the end of the war, part of the base facilities were taken over by the United States Navy, forming U.S. Fleet Activities Sasebo. Some parts of the base are shared with the Japan Self-Defense Forces, in particular the JMSDF, though the primary base of the JGSDF's Western Army Infantry Regiment is also among the facilities there.

Mergers

On April 1, 2005, the towns of Sechibaru and Yoshii (both from Kitamatsuura District) were merged into Sasebo.
On March 31, 2006, the towns of Kosaza and Uku (both from Kitamatsuura District) were merged into Sasebo.
On March 31, 2010, the towns of Emukae and Shikamachi (both from Kitamatsuura District) were merged into Sasebo.

Economy
Shipbuilding and associated heavy industries continue to dominate the economy of Sasebo. Adjacent to the naval base is the Sasebo Heavy Industries Co., Ltd. shipyard. The Port of Sasebo has an active fishing fleet, and many oyster and pearl farms are located on the Kujū-ku Islands.

The Mikawachi district has a 400-year-old pottery manufacturing industry.

Sasebo Station is the westernmost station in the JR passenger train system and is about two hours by train from Hakata Station in the city of Fukuoka (via the Midori line) and about an hour and half from Nagasaki Station in the city of Nagasaki. Across the street from Sasebo Station is the Sasebo Bus Center, which provides connecting service to many local destinations.

Geography

Climate
The climate is similar to that of Norfolk, Virginia. Rainy season lasts from early June to mid-July, and the summer is hot and humid. During the winter, there may be light snowfall and some freezing.

According to the Japan Meteorological Agency (JMA), Sasebo has a humid subtropical climate (Köppen climate classification Cfa) with hot summers and cool winters. Precipitation is significant throughout the year, but is somewhat lower in winter.

Demographics
Per Japanese census data, the population of Sasebo in 2020 is 243,223 people. Sasebo has been conducting censuses since 1920.

Transportation

The nearest airport is Nagasaki Airport in the city of Ōmura. The Kyushu Railway Company (JR Kyushu) provides rail transportation on the Sasebo Line, whose terminal is at Sasebo Station. The daily Midori Express provides transportation to/from Fukuoka's Hakata Station. Bus service to the Fukuoka Airport is also available from the Sasebo Bus Center. Three national highways crisscross the city: Route 35, 204, and 498.

Mayors of Sasebo (from 1902)

Points of interest

Hirado, to the north, was a foreign trade port and where William Adams is buried (James Clavell based his novel Shōgun (1975) on Adams' life)
Huis Ten Bosch (theme park), inspired by a Dutch trading post in nearby Hirado
Japan Maritime Self-Defense Force Museum
Kōzakihana, westernmost point on the island of Kyūshū
Kujū-ku Islands
, a large church which was built in a neogothic style in 1930, is the symbol of Sasebo. It is opposite the main railway station in Miura-cho district. Sasebo is the only Japanese city which uses the symbol of a Christian church as part of its seal/flag.
Saikai Pearl Sea Resort
Sasebo Zoological Park and Botanical Garden
Tenkaihō
Ureshino, to the south, has hot springs resorts

Cityscape

Sister city relations
Sasebo has sister-city relations with three places outside Japan and one within the country:
 Albuquerque, New Mexico, United States
 Coffs Harbour, New South Wales, Australia
 Xiamen, Fujian, China
 Kokonoe, Ōita

References

External links

Sasebo City official website 
Sasebo Tourist Information site 
Sasebo, Japan, Photo Gallery 
Japan National Tourism organization 

 
Cities in Nagasaki Prefecture
Port settlements in Japan
Populated coastal places in Japan